General Babka may refer to:
 General Babka (1924 film), an Austrian film directed by Michael Curtiz
 General Babka (1930 film), an Austrian film directed by Dezső Kertész